Atanas Shopov (born 4 October 1951) of Bulgaria is a former weightlifter who competed at the 1972 Summer Olympics and 1976 Summer Olympics.

Biography 
He was born October 4, 1951, in Dobrovnitsa village near Pazardzhik. He won the silver medal in the 90 kg category at the 1972 Summer Olympics and the bronze at the 1976 Summer Olympics. He also won the bronze at the 1971 European Weightlifting Championships in Sofia, the silver at the 1972 European Championships, and the bronze at the 1973 European Championships. He began training in 1964. Until 1972 he competed for Benkovski Pazardzhik. Then until 1974 for CSKA Sofia, and then until 1976 again for Benkovski. He has set 15 world records for juniors.

References

External links
 

1951 births
Living people
Bulgarian male weightlifters
Olympic weightlifters of Bulgaria
Weightlifters at the 1972 Summer Olympics
Weightlifters at the 1976 Summer Olympics
Olympic silver medalists for Bulgaria
Olympic bronze medalists for Bulgaria
Olympic medalists in weightlifting
Medalists at the 1976 Summer Olympics
Medalists at the 1972 Summer Olympics
European Weightlifting Championships medalists
20th-century Bulgarian people
21st-century Bulgarian people